Robin Moore's night frog (Nyctibatrachus robinmoorei) is a species of frog in the family Nyctibatrachidae. It is endemic to the Western Ghats.

Taxonomy 
The species specific name is in honor of Dr. Robin Moore, to appreciate his contribution to the conservation of amphibians.

Habitat and distribution 
The species is known only from its type locality in Kalakkad Mundanthurai Tiger Reserve. The specimens were collected from a marshy area covered with thick ground vegetation near a stream inside primary forest.

References 

Nyctibatrachus
Endemic fauna of the Western Ghats
Frogs of India
Amphibians described in 2017